Must Be the Feeling is a song by UK electronic music trio Nero from their debut album Welcome Reality. It was released as the seventh and final single from the album on 5 March 2012, peaking at number 25 on the UK Dance Chart. The song samples Carmen's 1984 song "Time to Move".

Music video
A music video to accompany the release of "Must Be the Feeling" was directed by Warren Fu and uploaded to YouTube on 10 February 2012 at a total length of four minutes.

Track listing

Chart performance

References

Nero (band) songs
2012 singles
2011 songs
Music videos directed by Warren Fu